Terrón is a surname. Notable people with the surname include:

José Terrón (1939–2019), Spanish actor
José Terrón (born 1991), Spanish footballer
Miguel Ángel Terrón (born 1961), Mexican politician

See also
Terron, given name